The Estadio Luis "Pirata" Fuente, named in honour of Luis de la Fuente, a Mexican football star who played in the 1950s. It has a capacity of 28,703 and is located at the seaside in Boca del Río. It is used mostly for football games and was the home of Tiburones Rojos de Veracruz before dissolving on December 18, 2019. This stadium is also referred as the "Colossus of the Virginia neighborhood" ("Coloso de el Fraccionamiento Virginia" in Spanish).

History
The ground was opened on March 17, 1967 as a new ground for Club Deportivo Veracruz to play on.

Concerts
Luis Miguel – December 1, 1995
Luis Miguel – March 12, 2006
Shakira – May 18, 2007
Maná – March 1, 2008
Elton John – May 8, 2010

See also
List of football stadiums in Mexico
Veracruz's Official site (stadium)

References

External links
World Stadiums entry

C.D. Veracruz
Luis Pirata Fuente
Sports venues in Veracruz